Konstancja Turczynowicz (1818 – 1880), was a Polish ballet dancer. She belonged to the more well known ballet dancers in Poland during her career.

She was engaged in the Ballet at the National Theatre, Warsaw between 1843 and 1853. She was a ballet instructor at the same institution in 1853-1863. She has been referred to as the most noted ballerina in Poland during the romantic era. She was the first Polish ballerina to interpret the role of Giselle.

References 

 Źródło: Słownik Biograficzny Teatru Polskiego 1765-1965, PWN Warszawa 1973

1818 births
19th-century Polish ballet dancers
1880 deaths